Fulton County is a county located in the U.S. state of Arkansas. As of the 2020 census, the population was 12,075. The county seat is Salem. Fulton County was formed on December 21, 1842, and named for William Fulton, the last governor of the Arkansas Territory. It is an alcohol prohibition or dry county.

Geography

Major highways

 U.S. Highway 62 Business
 Highway 9
 Highway 87
 Highway 175
 Highway 223
 Highway 289
 Highway 395

Adjacent counties
Ozark County, Missouri (northwest)
Howell County, Missouri (north)
Oregon County, Missouri (northeast)
Sharp County (east)
Izard County (south)
Baxter County (west)

Demographics

2020 census

As of the 2020 United States census, there were 12,075 people, 4,973 households, and 3,278 families residing in the county.

2000 census
As of the 2000 census, there were 11,642 people, 4,810 households, and 3,511 families residing in the county.  The population density was 19 people per square mile (7/km2).  There were 5,973 housing units at an average density of 10 per square mile (4/km2).  The racial makeup of the county was 97.67% White, 0.20% Black or African American, 0.67% Native American, 0.21% Asian, 0.06% from other races, and 1.19% from two or more races.  0.53% of the population were Hispanic or Latino of any race.

There were 4,810 households, out of which 27.40% had children under the age of 18 living with them, 62.40% were married couples living together, 7.80% had a female householder with no husband present, and 27.00% were non-families. 24.40% of all households were made up of individuals, and 12.80% had someone living alone who was 65 years of age or older.  The average household size was 2.39 and the average family size was 2.83.

In the county, the population was spread out, with 22.80% under the age of 18, 6.40% from 18 to 24, 23.70% from 25 to 44, 27.00% from 45 to 64, and 20.20% who were 65 years of age or older.  The median age was 43 years. For every 100 females there were 96.00 males.  For every 100 females age 18 and over, there were 93.10 males.

The median income for a household in the county was $25,529, and the median income for a family was $29,952. Males had a median income of $22,213 versus $18,066 for females. The per capita income for the county was $15,712.  About 12.70% of families and 16.30% of the population were below the poverty line, including 20.10% of those under age 18 and 12.70% of those age 65 or over.

Government
Over the past few election cycles Fulton county has trended heavily towards the GOP. The last Democrat (as of 2020) to carry the county was Bill Clinton, in 1996.

Education
Fulton County is the home to several public school districts:

 Mammoth Spring School District, including Mammoth Spring High School.
 Salem School District, including Salem High School.
 Viola School District, including Viola High School.

Communities

Cities
Ash Flat
Cherokee Village
Hardy
Horseshoe Bend
Mammoth Spring
Salem (county seat)

Town
Viola

Unincorporated communities

Bexar
Camp
County Line
Elizabeth
Gepp
Glencoe
Heart
Many Islands
Morriston
Ruth
Saddle
Sturkie
Wild Cherry

Townships

See also
 List of lakes in Fulton County, Arkansas
 National Register of Historic Places listings in Fulton County, Arkansas

References

 
1842 establishments in Arkansas
Populated places established in 1842